Chen Pi-Chao (c. 1937 – 25 March 2005) was a Taiwanese politician with the Democratic Progressive Party.

Personal life and academic career
Chen was a member of the first entering class of Tunghai University, graduating in 1959. He left Taiwan in 1961 to attend Wayne State University before going on to Princeton University, where he received a Ph.D. in politics in 1966 after completing a doctoral dissertation titled "The politics of population in Communist China: a case study of birth control policy, 1949-1965". Thereafter he did fieldwork on the topic in mainland China and published several other works on the topic. He naturalised as a U.S. citizen in 1973. He had two sons, David and Levi.

In politics
As democracy reform took hold in Taiwan in the 1990s, Chen returned to Taiwan in order to take part in politics. He renounced his U.S. citizenship in 1995.

Thereafter, he served as a consultant to the Ministry of National Defense and a member of the National Security Council during the presidency of Lee Teng-hui, and then became Vice-Minister of Defense during the presidency of Chen Shui-bian. Despite the fact that he was no longer a U.S. citizen by then, the fact that he had previously held U.S. citizenship made him a controversial choice for the position. He retired from public life in 2002 due to poor health.

Works

References

1930s births
2005 deaths
American emigrants to Taiwan
American political scientists
Democratic Progressive Party (Taiwan) politicians
People who renounced United States citizenship
Princeton University alumni
Senior Advisors to President Chen Shui-bian
Taiwanese emigrants to the United States
Tunghai University alumni
Wayne State University alumni
Date of birth missing
20th-century political scientists